Nanu Oya is a  long stream in the Central Province of Sri Lanka It originates from Pidurutalagala at an elevation of over  and drains into the Kotmale Oya at an elevation of approximately . The river was dammed in 1873 to create the popular Lake Gregory in Nuwara Eliya.

See also 
 Nanu Oya (town)
 List of dams and reservoirs in Sri Lanka
 List of rivers of Sri Lanka

References 

Rivers of Sri Lanka
Geography of Nuwara Eliya District